Nolan William Pratt (born August 14, 1975) is a Canadian former professional ice hockey defenceman. He is currently an assistant coach for his former club, the Colorado Avalanche of the National Hockey League (NHL).

Playing career
Pratt was selected in the 5th round, 115th overall, in the 1993 NHL Entry Draft by the Hartford Whalers from the Portland Winter Hawks of the Western Hockey League. Pratt made his NHL debut in the 1996–97 season with the Hartford Whalers, in the last year of the franchise. Pratt would then move with the team to the Carolina Hurricanes.

On June 24, 2000, he was traded along with a 2000 1st round pick (Vaclav Nedorost), a 2000 2nd round pick (Jared Aulin), and Philadelphia's 2nd round pick in 2000 (Argis Saviels) to Colorado for Sandis Ozolinsh and a second round pick (Tomas Kurka).

After the 2000–01 season, on June 24, 2001, Pratt was traded by the newly crowned Stanley Cup champions, the Colorado Avalanche, to the Tampa Bay Lightning for a 2001 NHL Entry Draft 6th round pick (Scott Horvath).

Pratt would help the Lightning, in the 2003–04 season, win the Stanley Cup. This marked Pratt's second Cup win.

Pratt was signed as a free agent by the Buffalo Sabres on November 1, 2007. With the Sabres, Pratt was most often paired with Dmitri Kalinin.

On September 23, 2008, Pratt, a free agent, was invited to the Dallas Stars training camp however was released just three days later. With no other NHL opportunities, Pratt signed with Russian team Amur Khabarovsk of the KHL on October 10, 2008.

After two seasons with Khabarovsk, Pratt left as a free agent and on November 8, 2010, signed a one-year contract with Lukko of the Finnish SM-Liiga.

Personal
Pratt is the older brother of Harlan Pratt, a professional ice hockey defenseman who was selected by the Pittsburgh Penguins in the 1997 NHL Entry Draft who has played more than 900 games across North America and Europe.

Career statistics

Awards and honours

References

External links

1975 births
Amur Khabarovsk players
Beast of New Haven players
Buffalo Sabres players
Canadian ice hockey defencemen
Carolina Hurricanes players
Colorado Avalanche coaches
Colorado Avalanche players
Hartford Whalers draft picks
Hartford Whalers players
Ice hockey people from Alberta
Living people
Lukko players
People from Fort McMurray
Portland Winterhawks players
Richmond Renegades players
Springfield Falcons players
Stanley Cup champions
Tampa Bay Lightning players
Bonnyville Pontiacs players
Canadian expatriate ice hockey players in Finland
Canadian expatriate ice hockey players in Russia
Canadian ice hockey coaches